Artsakh Basketball Club, is a professional basketball team based in Yerevan, Armenia. It was originally founded in 2017 in Stepanakert; the capital of the unrecognized Republic of Artsakh, as the basketball section of Artsakh FC, a Yerevan-based football club. Artsakh BC is a founding member of the Armenia Basketball League A.

History
On 22 October 2017, the founder of Artsakh FC Sevan Aslanyan, agreed to create a basketball section with the aim to play in the newly created Armenia Basketball League A, with Areg Vatyan becoming the sporting director of the basketball section, and Andrey Sarumyan becoming the head coach of the team. Bako Sahakyan, president of the unrecognized Republic of Artsakh, attended their first home league match, played in Stepanakert, the Republic's capital.

Artsakh qualified for the final of the inaugural season by winning the semifinals against Urartu, who were unbeaten during the regular season. In the finals, they defeated Artik for achieving their first title ever.

For their second season, the club moved to Yerevan, Armenia. After this second season, the club did not register for a third one in the A League.

Season by season

Current roster

References

External links
FC Artsakh Facebook account
Eurobasket.com Artsakh BC Page

2017 establishments in Armenia
Basketball teams established in 2017
Basketball teams in Armenia